Valerian Ivanovich Safonovich (1798, Podolia Governorate — 8 April 1867, Oryol) — was a Russian statesman and politician who served as ruler of Oryol Governorate from 1854 to 1861.

Educated in Moscow University. Worked in the Ministry of the Interior in 1842—1854.

After Nikolay Krusenstern’s transmission from Oryol to Odessa in 1854, Safonovich was appointed ruler of Oryol Governorate (governor). In 1861 he retired from the service.

Literature 
 Иванова Л. В. Сатирическая поэма о Сафоновиче (аннотация) // Орловский гражданский губернатор В. И. Сафонович — Орёл: Издатель Александр Воробьёв, 2004. — С. 40—42. — 66 с. — (Золотая книга Орловщины) 

1798 births
1867 deaths
Politicians of the Russian Empire
Moscow State University alumni
Russian memoirists
Russian nobility
19th-century memoirists